Martin Tomovski (born 10 July 1997) is a Macedonian handball player who plays for RK Vardar 1961 and the Macedonian national team.

He participated at the 2016 Men’s Junior European Handball Championship and 2017 Men's Junior World Handball Championship.

Honors  
 Macedonian Handball Super League
 Winner: 2022
 Macedonian Handball Cup
 Winner: 2022

References

1997 births
Living people
Macedonian male handball players
Sportspeople from Skopje
Mediterranean Games competitors for North Macedonia
Competitors at the 2018 Mediterranean Games